Robert Snyder (January 16, 1916 – March 21, 2004) was a documentary filmmaker  who won an Academy Award in 1950 as producer of The Titan: Story of Michelangelo.

Biography
Robert Snyder was born in Brooklyn, New York, on January 16, 1916. He married  Allegra Fuller, the daughter of Buckminster Fuller, professor emeritus and former chairwoman of the dance department at University of California at Los Angeles. They had a son Jaime and a daughter Alexandra.

Snyder won the Academy Award for Best Feature-Length Documentary for The Titan: Story of Michelangelo. It was a German/Swiss film titled Michelangelo: Life of a Titan, first released in 1938 directed by Curt Oertel. Snyder re-edited and shortened the film, adding narration by Fredric March.

Snyder was nominated for a second Academy Award in 1958 for a documentary on insects, The Hidden World, narrated by Gregory Peck. Snyder produced or directed more than a half-dozen biographical documentaries about individuals, including his own father-in-law, futurist Buckminster Fuller.  Other subjects included American patron of the arts, poet, publisher, and peace activist Caresse Crosby, author Henry Miller, historians Will and Ariel Durant, Claudio Arrau  and cellist Pablo Casals.

His 12-part series, Looking at Modern Art, and Michelangelo: Self-Portrait both appeared on the U.S. Public Broadcasting Service. He died after a lengthy illness in Pacific Palisades, California on March 21, 2004.

Archive
The Academy Film Archive houses the Masters & Masterworks Collection, named after Snyder's production company.

Works

As director 

 Willem de Kooning: Artist (short) 1995
 Michelangelo: A Self Portrait (documentary) 1989
 Claudio Arrau: A Life in Music (documentary) 1978
 Ruth Asawa: Of Forms & Growth (documentary short) 1978
 Anais Nin Observed (documentary) 1974
 The World of Buckminster Fuller (documentary) 1974
 NBC Experiment in Television (TV series documentary) Episode, Buckminster Fuller on Spaceship Earth (1971)
 The Henry Miller Odyssey (documentary) 1969
 A Glimpse of De Kooning (documentary) 1961
 A Visit with Pablo Casals 1957
 Halfway to Hell (documentary) 1954

As producer
 Willem de Kooning: Artist (short) (producer) 1995
 The Henry Miller Odyssey (documentary) (producer) 1969
 Bayanihan (documentary) (producer) 1962
 The Hidden World (documentary) (producer) 1958
 The Titan: Story of Michelangelo (documentary) (producer)  1950

As actor
 Code Name: Heraclitus (TV movie) as MacPherson  1967
 The Twilight Zone (TV series) as electrician Episode, "One More Pallbearer" (1962) ... Electrician (uncredited) 1961
 Outlaws (TV series) as Bundy  1961

Crew 
 Gods of Bali (documentary) (supervisor - 1952 version)

Bibliography
 This Is Henry, Henry Miller From Brooklyn (non-fiction book) 1974
 Anais Nin Observed: Portrait of the Woman as an Artist (non-fiction book) 1976
 Buckminster Fuller: An Autobiographical Monologue Scenario (biography) 1976

Awards

 Academy Awards

References

Added information

Snyder's website

1916 births
2004 deaths
American film directors